Ali Maximilian Ertürk (born September 1980) is a neuroscientist, inventor, and artist living in Munich, Germany. He is the director of a new Helmholtz Institute on Tissue Engineering and Regenerative Medicine in Munich since July 2019 and professor at the medical faculty. After his undergraduate study at Bilkent University in Ankara, he joined Max-Planck-Institute for Neurobiology for his PhD and Genentech Inc. for postdoctoral research.

His is known for invention of DISCO tissue transparency technology and deep learning based analysis of large 3D images in biomedicine. The methods collectively target to analyze cellular and molecular details of whole organs and bodies. Ertürk is full  (W3) Professor of the Ludwig Maximilian University of Munich and affiliated also with the University of Rochester. He also founded 2 biotechnology companies (Deep Piction and 1X1 Biotech) in 2022 with the aim of creating novel therapies to treat life-threatening illnesses such as cancer, Alzheimer's disease, and heart conditions.

Honors and awards 
 2020 Rolf Becker-Preis 
2020 Scientific and personal career profiled in Nature Methods 
 2020 ERC Consolidator Grant, European Research Council 
 2019 Cure Alzheimer’s Foundation researcher 
 2019 Mentioned as one of the 7 scientists in “Brain gain instead of brain drain in Germany” by Focus Magazine
 2018 NIH RO1
 2017 Fritz Thyssen Stiftung Award 
 2016 DFG Research Grant 
 2016 Member of Helmholtz Alliance ICEMED       
 2014 ERA-Net Award
 2014 Offered Sofja Kovalevskaja Award from Humboldt Foundation 
 2004–2007 Marie Curie PhD fellowship  
 1998–2003 Full education scholarship awarded by Bilkent University

Entrepreneurial life 
Ali Ertürk is founder of 2 biotechnology companies called Deep Piction and 1X1 Biotech. Deep Piction is a biotechnology company that combines biomedical research, artificial intelligence, engineering, and drug delivery methods to accelerate the development of new treatments for deadly diseases. The company's mission is to leverage the power of AI and other advanced technologies to improve the success rates of clinical trials and reduce the time it takes to develop new drugs.

One of Deep Piction's primary aims is to develop new methods to deliver drugs directly to correct cellular targets. By using AI to identify specific targets and design drug delivery systems, the company hopes to improve the efficacy and safety of new treatments. Additionally, Deep Piction is committed to reducing the use of animals in research by moving towards in silico models.

1X1 Biotech is another biotechnology company that uses AI to accelerate drug development. The company's mission is to discover and develop new treatments for diseases with high unmet medical needs, such as cancer and rare genetic disorders. 1X1 Biotech's approach combines machine learning, network biology, and high-throughput screening to identify promising drug candidates and optimize their efficacy.

One of 1X1 Biotech's primary aims is to improve the success rates of clinical trials by identifying biomarkers and patient subpopulations that are most likely to respond to a given treatment. By using AI to analyze large amounts of data from clinical trials, the company hopes to improve the precision of drug development and bring new treatments to patients faster.

Overall, Deep Piction and 1X1 Biotech are two promising biotechnology companies that are leveraging the power of AI and other advanced technologies to accelerate drug development and improve the success rates of clinical trials.

Art life 
Ali Ertürk is also known for his landscape and cityscapes photographs. He had photo art 3 exhibitions (2008 Munich, 2012 San Francisco, 2015 Munich).

References 

1980 births
Bilkent University alumni
Turkish neuroscientists
Living people